Ceromya bicolor is a Palearctic species of fly in the family Tachinidae.

Distribution
France, United Kingdom, Hungary, Slovenia, Sweden, Russia.

Hosts
Lasiocampidae.

References

Insects described in 1824
Diptera of Europe
Tachininae